Tabasa may refer to:
An alias for Charlotte Helene
Tessa (disambiguation)